Physocleora is a genus of moths in the family Geometridae described by Warren in 1897.

Species
Physocleora minuta Druce, 1898
Physocleora albibrunnea Warren, 1906
Physocleora albiplaga Warren, 1907
Physocleora bella Warren, 1907
Physocleora bicolor Warren, 1907
Physocleora conspersa Warren, 1907
Physocleora cretaria Warren, 1906
Physocleora dardusa Schaus, 1901
Physocleora enana Dognin, 1895
Physocleora ferruginata Warren, 1907
Physocleora flaviplaga Warren, 1907
Physocleora flexilinea Warren, 1907
Physocleora fulgurata Warren, 1906
Physocleora fuscicosta Warren, 1906
Physocleora grisescens Warren, 1907
Physocleora inangulata Dognin, 1916
Physocleora marcia Schaus, 1927
Physocleora nigrescens Prout, 1910
Physocleora nivea Dognin, 1900
Physocleora nubilata Warren, 1906
Physocleora obscura Schaus, 1898
Physocleora pauper Warren, 1897
Physocleora pulverata Warren, 1907
Physocleora punctilla Schaus, 1898
Physocleora pygmaeata Warren, 1907
Physocleora rectivecta Warren, 1906
Physocleora santosia Schaus, 1927
Physocleora scutigera Warren, 1906
Physocleora semirufa Dognin, 1912
Physocleora strigatimargo Dognin, 1916
Physocleora subochrea Warren, 1902
Physocleora suffusca Warren, 1906
Physocleora taeniata Warren, 1907
Physocleora tascaria Schaus, 1898
Physocleora tiburtia Stoll, 1781
Physocleora venirufata Warren, 1906

References

Boarmiini